An annular solar eclipse occurred on Monday, August 31–Tuesday, September 1, 1970. A solar eclipse occurs when the Moon passes between Earth and the Sun, thereby totally or partly obscuring the image of the Sun for a viewer on Earth. An annular solar eclipse occurs when the Moon's apparent diameter is smaller than the Sun's, blocking most of the Sun's light and causing the Sun to look like an annulus (ring). An annular eclipse appears as a partial eclipse over a region of the Earth thousands of kilometres wide. Annularity was visible from the Territory of Papua and New Guinea (today's Papua New Guinea), Gilbert and Ellice Islands (the part that belongs to Tuvalu now) on September 1st (Tuesday), West Samoa (name changed to Samoa later) and the whole American Samoa except Swains Island on August 31 (Monday).

Related eclipses

Solar eclipses of 1968–1971

Saros 144 

It is a part of Saros cycle 144, repeating every 18 years, 11 days, containing 70 events. The series started with partial solar eclipse on April 11, 1736. It contains annular eclipses from July 7, 1880, through August 27, 2565. There are no total eclipses in the series. The series ends at member 70 as a partial eclipse on May 5, 2980. The longest duration of annularity will be 9 minutes, 52 seconds on December 29, 2168.
<noinclude>

Tritos series

Metonic series

Notes

References

1970 8 31
1970 in science
1970 8 31
August 1970 events